Ripley Historic District is a national historic district located at Ripley, Jackson County, West Virginia. It encompasses 110 contributing buildings, one contributing site (the Early Settlers Cemetery), and one contributing structure that include the commercial and civic core of the town, and surrounding residential buildings. It includes example of popular architectural styles of the late-19th and early- to mid-20th century, including Queen Anne, Colonial Revival, Art Moderne, Neo-Classical Revival, Italianate and Modern. Notable buildings include the U.S. Post Office, Phillips/Pfost House, Alpine Theater, Hockenberry Store building, Jackson County Courthouse (1918-1920), the Beymer House, and the Hinzman House. Located within the district is the separately listed Clerc-Carson House.

It was listed on the National Register of Historic Places in 2004.

References

National Register of Historic Places in Jackson County, West Virginia
Historic districts in Jackson County, West Virginia
Commercial buildings on the National Register of Historic Places in West Virginia
Houses on the National Register of Historic Places in West Virginia
Queen Anne architecture in West Virginia
Colonial Revival architecture in West Virginia
Moderne architecture in West Virginia
Neoclassical architecture in West Virginia
Italianate architecture in West Virginia
Houses in Jackson County, West Virginia
Historic districts on the National Register of Historic Places in West Virginia
Clock towers in West Virginia